Last Call is a 2020 Bulgarian satirical black comedy drama film directed by Ivaylo Penchev. The film features an ensemble cast that includes Vasil Banov, Maria Bakalova, Phillip Avramov, Malin Krastev, Stefan Denolyubov, Kitodar Todorov, Yana Marinova and Lorina Kamburova.

Plot
Alexandra is a 23-year-old girl who is suicidal. Nikola, a 70-year-old writer, is determined to kill himself by jumping from the Asparuhov Bridge. At the very last moment, he notices Alexandra on the verge of ending her life in the same way. The elderly man becomes obsessed with helping her find reasons to live and, in order to save her, he offers her to marry him. His good intentions soon start to backfire when the tabloids get a hold of the story. A priest appears with his "re-educated" minions from the Sunday prison school along with an ex-naval captain in the company of giddy old men, sisters feuding over inheritance and a chubby grandchild.

Cast

Release
The film was originally set to be released in theatres in late 2020, but it was delayed due to the COVID-19 pandemic.

Accolades

References

External links
 

2020 films
2020 comedy-drama films
Films about dysfunctional families
Bulgarian comedy-drama films
2020s Bulgarian-language films
Films set in Bulgaria
Films shot in Bulgaria